The following is a list of the presidents of the University of South Carolina from its founding as South Carolina College in 1801, to the present day.

Presidents of the University of South Carolina

References
University of South Carolina. Commencement Exercises: School of Law. May 11, 2007.

External links

Office of the President

South Carolina
University of South Carolina presidents